2020 Metfone C-League  is the 36th season of the C-League. Contested by 13 clubs, it operates on a system of promotion and relegation with Cambodian Second League.

2020 season clubs

Teams

Personnel and Kits

Foreign players

The number of foreign players is restricted to five per team. A team can use four foreign players on the field in each game, including at least one player from the AFC region.

Players name in bold indicates the player is registered during the mid-season transfer window.

*Note: Bati Academy and Electricite du Cambodge do not use foreign players.

League table

Results

Top scorers

Hat-tricks

Clean sheets

Attendances

Overall statistical table

Matches

Fixtures and results of the 2020 C-League season.

Week 1

Bye: Nagaworld FC

Week 2

Bye: EDC FC

Week 3

Bye: National Police Commissary FC

Week 4

Bye: Bati Youth

Week 5

Bye: Boeung Ket

Awards

See also
2020 Cambodian Second League
2020 Hun Sen Cup

References

Cambodia
C-League seasons
1

Cambodian Second League
C-League, 2020